The Gray River is a river in the Fiordland area of New Zealand. It arises in the Cameron Mountains in Fiordland National Park and flows south-west and then north-west into Revolver Bay, on the south side of Rakituma / Preservation Inlet.

The river may have once flowed into Kisbee Bay, south of its current mouth, but it built a broad flat by depositing glacial debris, changing its course to Revolver Bay.

See also
List of rivers of New Zealand

References

Land Information New Zealand - Search for Place Names

Rivers of Fiordland